David Wells (born 8 June 1960) is a Scottish medium and astrologer. He has been featured as the main medium on Living TV's paranormal documentary series Most Haunted as well as its spin-off Most Haunted Live!.

Early life 
Born in  Kelloholm, Scotland, Wells states that he discovered his abilities after suffering from pneumonia, learning astrology and studying the Qabalah to "ground" his abilities.

Television and Media 
Besides featuring on the Most Haunted series, Wells' have also appeared on Jane Goldman Investigates and Psychic Interactive. He also serves as the official astrologer for NOW, the Scottish Daily Record and Spirit and Destiny Magazine. He was the astrologer for the Metro newspaper. Wells was also the main astrologer for UK national tabloid, the Daily Mirror. Before working as a medium, he served in the Royal Navy.

Most Haunted 
Wells was a guest medium on Most Haunted in 2004, during the episode filmed at the Greengate Brewery, along with the then resident medium Derek Acorah and London's resident parapsychologist Matthew Smith. He then took over Acorah's position on the show.

References

External links 
  (archive as at May 2014)

1960 births
Living people
People from Dumfries and Galloway
Scottish astrologers
20th-century astrologers
21st-century astrologers
Scottish spiritual mediums